Phosphomolybdic acid is the heteropolymetalate with the formula . It is a yellow solid, although even slightly impure samples have a greenish coloration. It is also known as dodeca molybdophosphoric acid or PMA, is a yellow-green chemical compound that is freely soluble in water and polar organic solvents such as ethanol. It is used as a stain in histology and in organic synthesis.

Histology
Phosphomolybdic acid is a component of Masson's trichrome stain.

Organic synthesis
Phosphomolybdic is used as a stain for developing thin-layer chromatography plates, staining phenolics, hydrocarbon waxes, alkaloids, and steroids. Conjugated unsaturated compounds reduce PMA to molybdenum blue. The color intensifies with increasing number of double bonds in the molecule being stained.

Phosphomolybdic acid is also occasionally used in acid-catalyzed reactions in organic synthesis. It has been shown to be a good catalyst for the Skraup reaction for the synthesis of substituted quinolines.

See also
 Phosphotungstic acid
 Folin-Ciocalteu reagent

References

Molybdenum(VI) compounds
Inorganic phosphorus compounds
Heteropoly acids